Tropea is an Italian surname. Notable people with the surname include:

Fernando Tropea (1905–1985), Italian film editor
John Tropea (born 1946), American guitarist

Italian-language surnames